The Sacramento Gold was an American soccer club based in Sacramento, California that was a member of the American Soccer League. They were original called the Sacramento Spirits when founded in 1976. During their final months of existence in the 1980 season they were known as the Sacramento Spirit.

History
In the team's inaugural season they failed to qualify for the ASL playoffs. In the 1977 season the Spirits won the West Division and made it to the ASL championship game. During the 1978 season the Spirits' ASL membership was canceled for failing to fulfill the obligations of the ASL constitution. They were replaced by a new team owned by local cabinet manufacturer, John Andreotti. Less than two weeks later the "new" franchise was named the Sacramento Gold and inherited the Spirits' 2–4–0 record, players, and remaining schedule. In 1979 Sacramento won the ASL title. For their part, the Gold ceased operations on July 16, 1980. In a situation similar to 1978, the Gold was replaced by the Spirit, however this time it was the club's boosters that assumed the responsibility of running the club. In the 1980 season the Sacramento club won the American Conference and reached the ASL title game for the third time in four years.

Coaches
 Dick Ott (1976)
 Bernard Hartze (1976)
 Bob Ridley (1976–77)
 Bill Williams (1979–80)

Yearly Awards
ASL Coach of the Year
1977 - Bob Ridley

ASL Rookie of the Year
1977 - Mal Roche
1978 - Emilio John

ASL All-Star Team
1977 - Daniel Mammana
1979 - Mickey Brown, Ian Filby
1980 - Raul Carrizo
ASL Leading Points Scorer
1979 - Ian Filby (45 Points)

Year-by-year

Honors
American Soccer League Champions (1): 1979
Runners-up (2): 1977, 1980
Participations in CONCACAF Champions' Cup: 1987

References

Defunct soccer clubs in California
G
American Soccer League (1933–1983) teams
1976 establishments in California
1980 disestablishments in California
Soccer clubs in California
Association football clubs established in 1976
Association football clubs disestablished in 1980
U.S. clubs in CONCACAF Champions' Cup